Crassula subaphylla is a succulent plant belonging to the family Crassulaceae. It is widespread in the Karoo regions of South Africa and Namibia.

Description

A small, sparse, shrubby species. 

Crassula subaphylla is a small, dense to sparse, straggly srublet, consisting of numerous brownish stems and branches, 15 — 30 cm tall (up to 60 when scrambling in vegetation). Branches are wiry, woody, but thin and brittle, twiggy (usually decumbent), with flaking strips of bark. Younger branches are slightly velvety (puberulous), reddish-brown, carnose. The leaves are widely dispersed along the branches with internodes of 0.5 — 1 (-3) cm, variable in shape, hairiness and colour (greyish- or reddish-green to yellow-green), distinctively pointed/conical (lanceolate-linear), and easily break off, 5 - 23 mm long and 4 — 8 mm in diameter. It flowers in spring to mid-summer with thyrses up to 8 cm tall with numerous dichasia. The flowers are cream with brown anthers, tubular, panduriform, to 5 mm, have distinctively recurved membranous wings on both sides of the petal tips.

Distribution and ecology
Succulent and Nama Karoo of South Namibia and RCA.<ref name=kew>{{cite web|url=https://powo.science.kew.org/taxon/urn:lsid:ipni.org:names:273520-1|title=Crassula subaphylla Harv.|accessdate=22 January 2022|work=Plants of the World Online|publisher=Royal Botanic Gardens Kew}} </ref>

 Regional variation 
The typical form, with small lanceolate leaves, occurs in the Little Karoo, the Great Karoo as far as Namibia, and in surrounding karooid and mountainous areas, as well as the Overberg in the southern Cape. 
The rare variety virgata is only found in the far western Namaqualand, and has smooth leaves on erect branches. 
The form that occurs around Worcester, in the south-west, also decumbent, sometimes has thin, glabrous leaves and only the young stems are slightly hairy.

Subspecies
 Crassula subaphylla var. subaphylla  — southern Namibia southwards into the Northern, Western, and Eastern Cape; also in the Free State.
 Crassula subaphylla var. virgata (Harv.) Toelken — RCA (Northern Cape, Western Cape).

 Related species 
The closest relatives of this species are Crassula mollis, Crassula atropurpurea, Crassula cultrata and Crassula pubescens. All of these species are caulescent perennials in the Crassula section Globulea, with woody branches, visible internodes, and leaves that do not persist long on the stems.

It can sometimes also be confused with the sympatric (but relatively unrelated) species Crassula tetragona or Crassula brevifolia''.

References

subaphylla
Flora of the Cape Provinces
Plants described in 1862